Coutu is a surname. Notable people with the surname include:

People

Surname
 Billy Coutu (1892–1978), Canadian ice hockey player
 Brandon Coutu (born 1984), American-football placekicker
 Christopher Coutu (born 1976), American Army National Guard officer, municipal and state elected leader
 Jack Coutu (1924–2017), English printmaker and sculptor
 Jean Coutu (actor) (1925–1999), Quebec actor
 Jean Coutu (pharmacist) (born 1927), Quebec pharmacist
 Richard Coutu (born 1951), Canadian ice hockey player
 Sarah-Ève Coutu-Godbout (born 1997), Canadian ice hockey player
 Sherry Coutu based in Cambridge, UK and originally from Canada, a serial entrepreneur
 Taylor Coutu (born 1987), American golfer

Middle name
 Guillaume Coutu Dumont, Canadian electronic musician

See also
 Jean Coutu Group, business in Quebec
 Augüera'l Coutu, one of 54 parishes in Cangas del Narcea, a municipality within the province and autonomous community of Asturias, in northern Spain